Since the inception of the Indian association football league competition, the I-League, in 2007, 45 players have scored three or more goals in a single match. The first player to achieve the feat was Brazilian Edu, who scored three times for JCT in a 3–1 victory over East Bengal. Eight players have scored more than three goals in a match: Odafa Onyeka Okolie, Jeje Lalpekhlua, Tolgay Özbey, Ranti Martins, Beto, Gbeneme Friday, Bektur Talgat Uulu and Dudu Omagbemi. Baljit Sahni holds the record for the quickest I-League hat-trick, netting three times against Shillong Lajong in 54 minutes.

Okolie has scored three or more goals 13 times in the I-League, more than any other player. Seven players have each scored hat-tricks for two or more different clubs: Okolie (Sporting Goa, Churchill Brothers and Mohun Bagan), Muritala Ali (Mahindra United and Mohun Bagan), Martins (Dempo, Prayag United and East Bengal), Josimar (Prayag United and Salgaocar), Lalpekhlua (Indian Arrows and Pailan Arrows), Özbey (East Bengal and Dempo) and C. K. Vineeth (Prayag United and Bengaluru).

Hat-tricks

Note: The results column shows the scorer's team score first

Multiple hat-tricks

Hat-tricks by nationality

See also
 List of Indian Super League hat-tricks
 List of Indian Women's League hat-tricks
 List of India national football team hat-tricks

References

I-League lists
I-League